O Casarão is a Brazilian telenovela produced and broadcast by TV Globo. It premiered on 7 June 1976 and ended on 10 December 1976, with a total of 168 episodes. It's the seventeenth "novela das oito" to be aired on the timeslot. It is created and written by Lauro César Muniz and directed by Daniel Filho and Jardel Mello.

Cast

First period: 1900 
 Oswaldo Loureiro - Deodato Leme
 Tony Correia - Jacinto de Sousa
 Ana Maria Grova - Francisca
 Miriam Pires - Olinda Leme
 Edson França - Eugênio Galvão
 Analu Prestes - Maria do Carmo
 Luthero Luiz - Afonso Estradas
 Carlos Duval - Eliseo
 Paulo Gonçalves - Cardoso (Cardosão)
 Hélio Ary - Vigário Felício

Second period: 1926-1936 
 Gracindo Júnior - João Maciel
 Sandra Barsotti - Carolina Galvão
 Dênis Carvalho - Atílio de Sousa
 Flávio Migliaccio - Coringa
 Ruy Rezende - Abelardo
 Laura Soveral - Francisca
 Ivan Cândido - Valentim
 Juan Daniel - Ramon
 Nestor de Montemar - Gervásio
 Augusto Xavier - Felipe

Third period: 1976 
 Paulo Gracindo - João Maciel
 Yara Cortes - Carolina Galvão de Sousa
 Mário Lago - Atílio de Sousa
 Paulo José - Jarbas Martins
 Aracy Balabanian - Violeta
 Rosi Campos - Ivete Mendes
 Renata Sorrah - Lina (Carolina Bastos)
 Armando Bogus - Estêvão Bastos
 Marcos Paulo - Eduardo
 Marcelo Picchi - Aldo
 Bete Mendes - Vânia
 Daisy Lúcidi - Alice Lins
 Zilka Salaberry - Mercedes
 Heloísa Helena - Mirtes
 Neuza Amaral - Marisa
 Arlete Salles - Maria Helena
 Elizângela - Mônica
 Ida Gomes - Caterina
 Francisco Milani - Teobaldo
 Tamara Taxman - Virgínia
 Elza Gomes - Ana
 Moacyr Deriquém - Sérgio
 Ruth de Souza - Pilar
 Fernando José - José Resende
 Arthur Costa Filho - Arturo
 Thelma Elita - Conceição
 Fernando Villar - Francisco Bastos
 Maria Cristina Nunes - Teresa
 Waldir Maia - Zenóbio
 Nilson Condé - Father Milton

References 

TV Globo telenovelas
1976 telenovelas
Brazilian telenovelas
1976 Brazilian television series debuts
1976 Brazilian television series endings
Portuguese-language telenovelas